Park Beom-ho (also Pak Beom-ho, ; born May 23, 1988) is a South Korean swimmer, who specialized in freestyle and individual medley events. He represented his nation South Korea at the 2008 Summer Olympics, and has won a bronze medal, as a member of the men's 4×200 m freestyle relay team, at the 2006 Asian Championships in Singapore.

Park competed for the South Korean swimming team in the men's 200 m individual medley at the 2008 Summer Olympics in Beijing. He set a new personal best of 2:04.81 to set himself up a fourth seed headed into the final at the Good Luck Beijing China Open six months earlier, finishing under the FINA B-cut (2:05.65) by almost 0.85 of a second. Swimming in heat one, Park pulled from behind on the rear of a dominant freestyle leg to beat two-time Olympians Iurii Zakharov of Kyrgyzstan and Danil Bugakov of Uzbekistan by less than a second for the fifth spot in 2:06.17. Park failed to advance into the semifinals, as he placed forty-fourth overall in the prelims.

References

External links
NBC 2008 Olympics profile

1988 births
Living people
South Korean male medley swimmers
Olympic swimmers of South Korea
Swimmers at the 2006 Asian Games
Swimmers at the 2008 Summer Olympics
South Korean male freestyle swimmers
Swimmers from Seoul
Asian Games competitors for South Korea
20th-century South Korean people
21st-century South Korean people